The 1996 Asian Artistic Gymnastics Championships were the first edition of the Asian Artistic Gymnastics Championships, and were held in Changsha, China, in September 1996.

Medal summary

Men

Women

Medal table

References

A
Asian Gymnastics Championships
Asian Gymnastics Championships
International gymnastics competitions hosted by China